F-box/WD repeat-containing protein 7 is a protein that in humans is encoded by the FBXW7 gene.

Function 

This gene encodes a member of the F-box protein family which is characterized by an approximately 40 amino acid motif, the F-box. The F-box proteins constitute one of the four subunits of ubiquitin protein ligase complex called SCFs (SKP1-cullin-F-box), which function in phosphorylation-dependent ubiquitination. The F-box proteins are divided into 3 classes: Fbws containing WD-40 domains, Fbls containing leucine-rich repeats, and Fbxs containing either different protein-protein interaction modules or no recognizable motifs. The protein encoded by this gene was previously referred to as FBX30, and belongs to the Fbws class; in addition to an F-box, this protein contains 7 tandem WD40 repeats. This protein binds directly to cyclin E and probably targets cyclin E for ubiquitin-mediated degradation. Other well established pro-proliferative targets of FBXW7 are c-Myc and Notch1. Mono-allelic mutations in this gene are detected in sporadic cancers [e.g., cholangiocarcinoma (35%), T-ALL (31%), endometrial carcinoma (16%), colorectal carcinoma (16%), bladder cancer (10%), gastric carcinoma (6%), lung squamous cell carcinoma (5%), etc.]. These findings implicate the gene's potential role in the pathogenesis of human cancers.  Despite being commonly acknowledged as a haploinsufficient tumor suppressor, mutations are not found in some cancers, such as acute myeloid leukemia and multiple myeloma. One possibility is that FBXW7 substrate stabilization is detrimental in these neoplasms.  For example, the FBXW7 substrate C/EBPα suppresses AML and multiple myelomas require constitutive NF-κB signaling; therefore, disruption of FBXW7-mediated ubiquitylation of IκBd in these tumors results in cell death.

Three transcript variants encoding three different isoforms have been found for this gene.

Interactions 

FBXW7 has been shown to interact with:
 MYB, 
 PPARGC1A, 
 Parkin (ligase),  and
 SKP1A.

References

Further reading